Bombs And Bottles (also known as BnB or B&B, real name Harrison Zafrin, born January 23, 1990) is an American recording artist and record producer from Brooklyn, New York, and spent the majority of his life growing up in the New York City suburb of New Rochelle. Harrison formed Bombs and Bottles in 2009 while enrolled in college at Binghamton University.

Work
Bombs And Bottles' first EP, GammaMax, was released on April 23, 2009. Bombs and Bottles released his debut full-length record Pop and Roll in the Fall of 2010.

In 2012, Bombs and Bottles released a five track EP called "Tonight". In an interview, MTV said that "Zafrin has put together a cohesive set of songs that paint a picture of a night on the town; from getting ready ("PreGame") all the way to the end of the night ("When The Lights Go Out"). Utilizing a myriad of electronic sounds, Bombs and Bottles has created the soundtrack to your Saturday night." The record "Tonight" led to placements in television shows such as The Pauly D Project, Are You the One?, The Real L Word, Scrubbing In, and Teen Wolf.

Bombs and Bottles released another EP called "The Heist". It was used as the soundtrack to New York Fashion Week designer Marlon Gobels Fall/Winter Runway show of the same name. Bombs and Bottles also collabed with Zanski to make the Soundtrack for Marlon Gobel's Spring/Summer Runway show called "We Built This City".

Discography
Albums/EP's

2011

Pop And Roll- "Tonight is Forever", "Interlude", "Get it Right", "Money", "Shut it Down" "Facade", "Until The Sunrise", "Bad Intentions (Reprise)", "Playing Hard" (Video Edit)", "Venom On Your Lips", "Heartbeats", "Klub"

2012

Tonight- "PreGame", "The Club", "The Game (part 1)", "The Game (part 2)", "When The Lights Go Out"

The Heist- "I Will Take You There", "The Heist", "Runaway"

2013

We Built This City (w/ Zanski)- "On Diamonds", "On Gold"

2014

LOFT- "Angelina", "September", 1AM"

"DWK"

Various Songs

2011

"Bad Intentions"

2012

"The Getaway", "Turn Me On", "Numb And Young", "Money 3.0"

2013

"No One Else", "Be Mine Again", "Bare", "I Will", "Put It On" "On Diamonds"

Edits/Remixes

"Playing Hard (OMG)", "Money (More Money)", "The Game (Part 1)" (BnB Edit), "I Will" (Marlon Gobel- The Punishment of Luxury Edit)

As Featured Guest

ak9 & Tyler Hunt f/ Bombs And Bottles- "Shadow"

Zanski f/ Bombs And Bottles- "Candy"

Zanski f/ Bombs And Bottles- "Atlas"

References 

Musicians from New York City
American pop music groups